Xeromphalina campanelloides is a species of Tricholomataceae fungus. The fungus is known from coastal British Columbia and Washington, and eastern montane New York and Quebec. It was described as new to science in 1988 by Canadian mycologist Scott Redhead.

References

External links

Fungi described in 1988
Fungi of North America